The 1945–46 League of Ireland was the 25th season of senior football in the Republic of Ireland.

Cork United were the defending champions.

Changes from 1944–45 
Brideville failed to get re-elected and were replaced by Waterford, who returned after a five-year absence.

Teams

Season overview
Cork United successfully defended their title, winning their fifth title in six years.

Table

Results

Top goalscorers

See also 

 1945–46 FAI Cup

Ireland
Lea
League of Ireland seasons